Paul Patrick O'Brien (born 3 December 1967) is a Scottish retired footballer who made over 170 appearances as a forward in the Scottish League for Queen's Park.

Honours 
Brechin City
 Scottish League Second Division second-place promotion: 1992–93

References

External links 
 

Scottish footballers
Scottish Football League players
Queen's Park F.C. players
Association football forwards
1967 births
Footballers from Glasgow
Dunfermline Athletic F.C. players
Brechin City F.C. players
Living people